Tuanku Tengku Fauziah binti Almarhum Tengku Abdul Rashid (Jawi: توانكو تڠكو فوزية بنت المرحوم تڠكو عبدالرشيد; born 6 June 1946) is the current Raja Perempuan (Queen consort) of Perlis. She also served as the Raja Permaisuri Agong of Malaysia from 13 December 2001 to 12 December 2006.

Tuanku Fauziah is a princess of the royal houses of Terengganu on her father's side and Kelantan on her mother's side. Tuanku Fauziah is the daughter of Yang Amat Mulia Almarhum Tengku Temenggong Tengku Abdul Rashid ibni Almarhum Sultan Sulaiman Badrul Alam Shah of Terengganu and Yang Amat Mulia Almarhum Tengku Petri binti Almarhum Sultan Ibrahim of Kelantan. Her father granted the title of Tengku Temenggong by the Sultan of Kelantan, Sultan Ibrahim. She was born on 6 June 1946, and spent her early years in Kota Bharu, Kelantan.

Early years
As a student at Zainab English School, Tuanku Fauziah enjoyed recreation and sports such as stage acting, netball and rounders.

At the very young age of 17, she became engaged to Tuanku Syed Sirajuddin, who at that time was still studying in the United Kingdom. To prepare her for her future role of consort to the heir and later to the ruler, she was invited to stay with her future husband's family while they lived at Istana Negara, Kuala Lumpur as the Yang di-Pertuan Agong and Raja Permaisuri Agong of Malaysia. During her stay with her future in laws, she made trips back to Kelantan whenever necessary.

Marriage
On 15 February 1967, Tuanku Fauziah was given in marriage to Tuanku Syed Sirajuddin who was then the Raja Muda of Perlis. In recognition of her new position, she was conferred the prestigious Seri Paduka Mahkota Perlis (SPMP) award by her father-in-law, the late Tuanku Syed Putra, eight months later. On 30 April 1968, Tuanku Fauziah was officially created "Duli Yang Teramat Mulia Raja Puan Muda Perlis".

As a young bride, Tuanku Fauziah accompanied her husband on all his postings as a junior military officer. However two years later, she returned to Perlis for good when Tuanku Syed Sirajuddin decided to take on his official role as Crown Prince of the State.

Becoming Queen
Tuanku Fauziah was officially declared "Duli Yang Maha Mulia Raja Perempuan Perlis" on 14 July 2000. On 12 December 2001, Tuanku Fauziah was officially declared as "Seri Paduka Baginda Raja Permaisuri Agong" when her husband Tuanku Syed Sirajuddin became the 12th Yang di-Pertuan Agong of Malaysia.

Royal Family
Tuanku Fauziah is the mother of a son and a daughter, Tuanku Syed Faizuddin Putra Jamalullail, Raja Muda, and Sharifah Fazira, Tengku Puteri Mahkota. She is close to her only daughter-in-law, Tuanku Lailatul Shahreen, Raja Puan Muda and only son-in-law, Mohammad Yaakob.

She is also related to the Royal Pattani family in southern Thailand.

Awards and recognitions

She has been awarded:

Honours of Perlis 
  : 
  Recipient of the Royal Family Order of Perlis (DKP, 17 May 2016)
  Recipient of the Perlis Family Order of the Gallant Prince Syed Putra Jamalullail (DK, 1999)
 Knight Grand Companion of the Order of the Gallant Prince Syed Putra Jamalullail (SSPJ, 1997)
  Knight Grand Commander of the Order of the Crown of Perlis or Star of Safi (SPMP, 1967)

Honours of Malaysia 
  : 
  Recipient of the Order of the Crown of the Realm (DMN, 2001)
  : 
  Knight Grand Commander of the Order of the Crown of Johor (SPMJ, before 1967)
  : 
  Recipient of the Royal Family Order or Star of Yunus (DK, 2002)
  : 
  Member 1st class of the Family Order of the Crown of Indra of Pahang (DK I, 26 October 2005)

Foreign Honours 
  : 
 Grand Cross of the Royal Order of Cambodia (16 December 2002)
  : 
 Grand Cross of the Order of Merit of the Italian Republic (9 June 2003)
  : 
 Grand Cordon of the Order of the Precious Crown (7 March 2005)
 Gold and Silver Star (Second class) of the Order of the Sacred Treasure (22 February 1970)
 : 
 Dame Grand Cross of the Order of Isabella the Catholic (13 May 2004)
 : 
 Commander Grand Cross of the Royal Order of the Polar Star (14 September 2005)

Places named after her 
Several places were named after her, including:
 Tuanku Fauziah Hospital in Kangar, Perlis
 Muzium dan Galeri Tuanku Fauziah, Universiti Sains Malaysia, Gelugor, Penang
 SMK Raja Puan Muda Tengku Fauziah, a secondary school in Kaki Bukit, Perlis
 Taman Fauziah, a residential area in Kangar, Perlis

See also
Yang Di-Pertuan Agong
Raja Permaisuri Agong

References

External links
 Raja Perlis Web Site

1946 births
Perlis royal consorts
Malaysian royal consorts
House of Jamalullail of Perlis
Living people
People from Kota Bharu
Malaysian people of Malay descent
Malaysian Muslims

Knights Grand Commander of the Order of the Crown of Johor
 
Knights Grand Cross of the Order of Merit of the Italian Republic
Grand Cordons of the Order of the Precious Crown
Recipients of the Order of the Sacred Treasure, 2nd class
Recipients of the Order of Isabella the Catholic
Dames Grand Cross of the Order of Isabella the Catholic
Knights Grand Cross of the Royal Order of Cambodia
People from Kelantan
Royal House of Kelantan
Royal House of Terengganu
Malaysian queens consort
Recipients of the Order of the Crown of the Realm